is a Japanese publishing company focused on manga-related publication, including magazines and books.

The company was first established in August 1992 as a limited company under the name Studio DNA whose main purpose was to edit shōnen manga. In January 1998, Studio DNA became a public company and moved from merely editing to now being a publishing company. In December 2001, a publishing company was formed named Issaisha which started the shōjo manga magazine Monthly Comic Zero Sum. In March 2005, Studio DNA and Issaisha merged into the current Ichijinsha company. In October 2016, Ichijinsha was acquired by Kodansha and became its wholly owned subsidiary.

Magazines published
Febri (formerly Chara☆Mel)
Comic Rex
Monthly Comic Zero Sum
Comic Yuri Hime
gateau
THE IDOLM@STER MILLION LIVE! MAGAZINE Plus+, renewal of THE IDOLM@STER MILLION LIVE! MAGAZINE

Defunct magazines
Comic Yuri Hime S
Waai!
Waai! Mahalo
Comic Zeru-Sum Zoukan WARD
Manga Palette Lite
Niconico Yuri Hime (web magazine, jointly with NicoNico Douga)
Manga 4-Koma Palette
The four-panel comic strip magazine  started as a special edition of Comic Rex.

Web magazines
Zero Sum Online
comic POOL (jointly with Pixiv)
Yurihime@Pixiv
LOVEBITES (jointly with Seymour)
Manga 4-koma Palette Online

References

External links
  

 
Japanese companies established in 1992
Book publishing companies in Tokyo
Magazine publishing companies in Tokyo
Manga distributors
Publishing companies established in 1992
Comic book publishing companies in Tokyo
Kodansha